The 1924 Giro di Lombardia was the 20th edition of the Giro di Lombardia cycle race and was held on 9 November 1924. The race started and finished in Milan. The race was won by Giovanni Brunero.

General classification

References

1924
Giro di Lombardia
Giro di Lombardia